Kietlów  is a village in the administrative district of Gmina Jemielno, within Góra County, Lower Silesian Voivodeship, in southwestern Poland. Prior to 1945, it was part of Germany.

References

Villages in Góra County